Ousmane William Mbaye (born 1952), is a Senegalese filmmaker. Mbaye is best known as the director of the critically acclaim documentary Mère-Bi and films Doomi Ngacc, Fresque and Kemtiyu, Cheikh Anta. Apart from filmmaking, he is also an executive producer, line producer, screenwriter, foreign producer, director of photography, sound recordist, production manager, editor, and producer.

Personal life
He was born in 1952 in Paris, France. His mother, Annette Mbaye d'Erneville is Senegalese woman of letters.

Career
Mbaye trained at the Conservatoire Libre du Cinéma Français (Free Conservatory of French Cinema). Then he studied at the University of Paris 8 Vincennes-Saint-Denis where he started filmmaking. After the graduation, he moved to Senegal. Then he worked as an assistant director. From 1990 to 1997, he was the coordinator and founder of the Rencontres Cinématographiques of Dakar (RECIDAK).

In 1979, he produced and directed his maiden short film Doomi Ngacc. The short won the Bronze Tanit at the Carthage Film Festival. Since 2000, he started to make documentaries such as Président Dia and Kemtiyu, Cheikh Anta. In 2003, he made the documentary short Xalima la plume about Senegalese musician Seydina Insa Wade. The short later won the Documentary Prize at Milan Film Festival. In 2005, he directed the documentary Fer et verre, focused on Senegalese plastic artist Anta Germane Gaye. In 2008, he made the short Mère-Bi, which is based on his mother.

In 2016, he made the biographical documentary Kemtiyu, Cheikh Anta which deals with the life of Senegalese historian, doctor, and politician Cheikh Anta Diop. The film received positive reviews from critics and screened at several international film festivals. He was awarded the EU/ACP prize at Panafrican Film and Television Festival of Ouagadougou (FESPACO) 2017.

Filmography

See also
 Henriette-Bathily Women's Museum

References

External links
 

1952 births
Senegalese film producers
French people of Senegalese descent
Living people
Senegalese film directors